Nigrolamia farinosa is a species of beetle in the family Cerambycidae. It was described by Henry Walter Bates in 1884, originally under the genus Melanopolia. It is known from Gabon.

References

Endemic fauna of Gabon
Lamiini
Beetles described in 1884